The 1991 Gator Bowl was a college football bowl game played on January 1, 1991.  The Big Ten Conference co-champion Michigan Wolverines defeated the Ole Miss Rebels of the Southeastern Conference (SEC), 35–3. For sponsorship reasons, the game was officially known as the Mazda Gator Bowl.

This game was the last SEC–Big Ten matchup in the Gator Bowl for twenty years; the bowl entered into an exclusive contract featuring those two conferences beginning with the 2011 Gator Bowl.

Teams

Michigan Wolverines

Michigan entered the game with an overall record of 8–3, 6–2 in the Big Ten.

Ole Miss Rebels

Ole Miss entered the game with an overall record of 9–2, 6–2 in the SEC.

Scoring summary

First quarter
 Michigan - Desmond Howard, 63-yard pass from Elvis Grbac (John Carlson kick)

Second quarter
 Ole Miss - Brian Lee, 51-yard field goal
 Michigan - Jarrod Bunch, 7-yard pass from Elvis Grbac (John Carlson kick)

Third quarter
 Michigan - Desmond Howard, 50-yard pass from Elvis Grbac (John Carlson kick)
 Michigan - Jarrod Bunch, 5-yard run (John Carlson kick)
 Michigan - Derrick Alexander, 33-yard pass from Elvis Grbac (John Carlson kick)

Fourth quarter
 No score

References

External links
 Summary at Bentley Historical Library, University of Michigan Athletics History

Gator Bowl
Gator Bowl
Michigan Wolverines football bowl games
Ole Miss Rebels football bowl games
20th century in Jacksonville, Florida
Gator Bowl January
January 1991 sports events in the United States